Ian Bell (born 1982) is an English cricketer.

Ian Bell may also refer to:

 Ian Bell (journalist) (1956–2015), Scottish journalist and writer
 Ian Bell (literaturist) (born 1947), professor of American literature at Keele University
 Ian Bell (musician) (born 1954), Canadian musician
 Ian Bell (programmer) (born 1962), British computer programmer
 Ian Bell (CEO) (born 1976), founder and CEO of Digital Trends
 Ian Spencer Bell, American dancer, choreographer, teacher, and poet